is a Japanese baseball player. He plays pitcher for the Chunichi Dragons on a developmental contract in the Western League.

He was the 2nd pick for the Dragons in the 2015 Development Draft.

References

External links
 Dragons.jp
 NPB.jp

1996 births
Living people
Baseball people from Nagasaki Prefecture
Japanese baseball players
Nippon Professional Baseball pitchers
Chunichi Dragons players